Quraysh Ali Lansana (born Ron Myles  September 13, 1964, Enid, Oklahoma) is an American poet, book editor, civil rights historian, and professor. He has authored 20 books in poetry, nonfiction and children’s literature. In 2022, he was a Tulsa Artist Fellow and Director of the Center for Truth, Racial Healing & Transformation at Oklahoma State University-Tulsa, where he was also Lecturer in Africana Studies and English. Lansana is also credited as creator and executive producer of "Focus: Black Oklahoma," a monthly radio program on the public radio station KOSU.

Early life and education
Born Ron Myles in Enid, Oklahoma, on September 13, 1964, he graduated Enid High School in 1982. Prior to focusing on poetry, in the 1980s he studied broadcast journalism at the University of Oklahoma and worked as an assignment editor at KWTV. After spending a year living in Medicine Park, Oklahoma, Lansana decided to move to Chicago in 1988. There he worked as an editor for Glencoe/McGraw-Hill, and founded Nappyhead Press.

Lansana grew up in the African Methodist Episcopal Church, but changed his name to Quraysh Ali after converting to Islam in 1993, and adopted the last name Lansana upon marriage to now ex-wife Emily Hooper in 1996. He practiced Islam until 1999, later also turning to African faiths such as Yoruba and attending Trinity United Church of Christ in Chicago.

He decided to return to school in 1996, earning his B.A. in African American Studies at Chicago State University where Gwendolyn Brooks was his mentor.  Lansana holds an M.F.A. in creative writing from New York University.

Teaching career

Lansana has taught at the Juilliard School, the School of the Art Institute of Chicago, Oklahoma City University, and was the director of the Gwendolyn Brooks Center for Black Literature and Creative Writing at Chicago State University. He currently works as the acting director for the Center for Truth, Racial Healing and Transformation, Writer in Residence for the Center for Poets & Writers, and as a professor of Africana Studies and English at Oklahoma State University-Tulsa.

Historical research

As a historian Lansana has extensively researched the 1921 Tulsa race massacre. For the centennial of the tragedy, he helped create an exhibit at Tulsa's Philbrook Museum of Art, taught workshops at OSU-Tulsa, worked with the History Channel, WYNC Studios, and KOSU to create Blindspot: Tulsa Burning podcast, and hosted the documentary Tulsa Race Massacre: 100 Years Later which broadcast on OETA. Lansana also wrote a children's book about the Greenwood District with Najah-Amatullah Hylton and illustrator Skip Hill entitled Opal’s Greenwood Oasis.

Awards

In 1999 he won the Wallace W. Douglas Distinguished Service Award and the Henry Blakely Award, was nominated for the NAACP Image Award in 2012, and was named the Chicago Black Book Fair's Poet of the Year in 2000. He also received a Tulsa Artist Fellowship to create radio program entitled Focus: Black Oklahoma for NPR affiliate KWGS.

Works

Poetry collections
The Skin of Dreams: new and collected poems 1995-2018 (2019)
A Gift from Greensboro Penny Candy Books. (2016) 
 with Christopher Stewart, The Walmart Republic Mongrel Empire Press (2014)
mystic turf Willow Books (2012)
They Shall Run: Harriet Tubman Poems Third World Press (2004)
Southside Rain Third World Press (2000)

Chapbooks
reluctant minivan (2014)
bloodsoil sooner red. (2009)
Greatest Hits: 1995-2005 (2006) 
cockroach children: corner poems and street psalms (1995)

Children's books
The Big World Addison Wesley (1999)
with Skip Hill, Gift From Greensboro Penny Candy Books (2021)
with Najah-amatullah Hylton and Skip Hill, Opal's Greenwood Oasis The Calliope Group Ltd (2021)

Editor
African American Literature Reader Glencoe/McGraw-Hill. (2001)
I Represent Gallery 37, Chicago, IL (1996)
dream in yourself Gallery 37, Chicago, IL (1997)
with Georgia A. Popoff, Our Difficult Sunlight: A Guide to Poetry, Literacy & Social Justice in Classroom & Community Teachers & Writers Collaborative (2011)
The Breakbeat Poets: New American Poetry in the Age of Hip Hop Haymarket Books (2015)
 Medina, Tony., Bashir, Samiya A, and Lansana, Quraysh Ali. Role Call : A Generational Anthology of Social and Political Black Art & Literature. Chicago: Third World, 2002.
 with Georgia A. Popoff, The Whiskey of Our Discontent: Gwendolyn Brooks as Conscience and Change Agent Haymarket Books, 2017.
 with Sandra Jackson-Opoku, Revise the Psalm: Work Celebrating the Writing of Gwendolyn Brooks Curbside Splendor Publishing, 2017.

References

African-American poets
Writers from Enid, Oklahoma
Writers from Chicago
1964 births
Living people
Chicago State University alumni
New York University alumni
Poets from Oklahoma
Poets from Illinois
Juilliard School faculty
School of the Art Institute of Chicago faculty
Oklahoma City University faculty
American male poets
20th-century American poets
20th-century American male writers
21st-century American poets
21st-century American male writers
Enid High School alumni
Historians from Oklahoma
Oklahoma State University faculty
Historians from Illinois
20th-century African-American writers
21st-century African-American writers
African-American male writers